John Otterson may refer to:

 Jack Otterson (1905–1991), American art director
 John E. Otterson (1881–1964), American engineer and business executive